Clara Roquet (born 1988) is a Spanish filmmaker from Catalonia.

Biography 
Roquet was born in 1988. Reported birthplaces include Malla, Vic, and Barcelona. She studied at the Pompeu Fabra University and Columbia University.

She made her writing debut in a feature film with 10,000 km, which she co-wrote alongside Carlos Marqués-Marcet. She has since written and co-written films such as Petra (2018), The Days to Come (2019), and Costa Brava, Lebanon (2021). She made her directorial debut in a feature film with the 2021 drama Libertad.

Accolades

References

External links
 

1988 births
Spanish film directors
Spanish women film directors
Living people
21st-century Spanish screenwriters